Alison Brendom Alves dos Santos (born 3 June 2000) is a Brazilian athlete specialising in the 400 metres hurdles. He is a bronze medalist at the 2020 Olympic Games, the 2022 World Champion and the third fastest athlete in the history of the event, in addition to being a gold medalist in the 2019 Pan American Games. Dos Santos is currently the South American and Pan American record holder in the competition.

He was the 2022 Diamond League 400 m hurdles champion.

Early life
As a 10-month-old, a domestic accident left him with third-degree oil burns on his head and characteristic scars.

As a child, Alison took a chance on judo. It was during this period that he earned the nickname Piu, but soon left the mat for athletics. At the age of 16, he was already competing among adults.

Career
Dos Santos won a bronze medal at the 2018 World U20 Championships.

At just 19 years old, he participated in the 2019 Pan American Games, held in Lima, Peru, where he won the 400m hurdles event, breaking his personal record, and the South American under-20 record, with the time of 48.45. It was the fourth best time in the world at the moment, and with that, Dos Santos qualified for the 2020 Summer Olympics. He had already won gold in the same event, at the 2019 Summer Universiade, weeks before.

In September 2019, Dos Santos went to the 2019 World Athletics Championships in Doha, Qatar, where he won the 400m hurdles semifinal in 48.35, breaking his personal record again and going to the final with the second best overall time. The last time a Brazilian had reached the final of this event in the Worlds was with Eronilde Araújo, in 1999. In the final, he broke his personal record again, finishing in seventh place with a time of 48.28. He was just 0.25s from the bronze medalist.

In April 2021, he broke his own Brazilian record again with a time of 48.15 in Des Moines, USA. On 9 May 2021, he broke the South American record that belonged since 2005 to Panama's athlete Bayano Al Kamani (47.84). Dos Santos obtained the 47.68 mark in the Mt.Sac stage of the Continental Athletics Tour in California (USA). On 28 May 2021, he again broke the South American record with a time of 47.57 in Doha, Qatar, participating in the Diamond League. This time placed Alison as third in the world ranking. He even topped the list in April. The time of 47.57 already placed him as 22nd best runner in the race of all time. On 1 July 2021, in the Oslo stage of the Diamond League, he again lowered his own South American record, with a time of 47.38. This time placed him, at the moment, as the 15th-best runner in the history of the race. He improved this record with 47.34, three days later, winning in Stockholm Diamond League stage.

At the delayed 2020 Summer Olympics in Tokyo, Alison qualified for the final of the 400 metres hurdles, breaking the South American record with a time of 47.31. In the final, he got the bronze medal, breaking the South American record again by a large margin, with a time of 46.72 (he lowered his time by 0.6 seconds). Both he, Warholm and Benjamin surprisingly lowered their times: Warholm lowered the world record by almost 0.8 seconds (45.94), and Benjamin beat the Americas' record also by 0.8 seconds (46.17). The event was the strongest in 400m hurdles history, with the three Olympic medalists getting the three best times in the history of the event, all beating Kevin Young's old world record (which had lasted almost 30 years and had only fallen a month before the Olympics). Alison became the 3rd best in the history of the race at just 21 years old.

In April 2022, he made the second best Brazilian mark in history in the 400m, 44.54, an event that is not his specialty and what gave him the index to qualify for the Eugene World Championship (he would be a bronze medalist in the 400m with this mark, in this championship). In May 2022 he won a gold medal in the Doha stage of the Diamond League with a time of 47.24, defeating Rai Benjamin. In June 2022 he won a gold medal in the Stockholm stage of the Diamond League with a time of 46.80.

On 19 July 2022, in the 2022 World Athletics Championships in Eugene, Oregon, he broke the South American record again and the World Championship record in the 400 metres hurdles with a time of 46.29, becoming world champion, defeating Warholm and Benjamin. It was the first men's gold in the history of Brazil in the World Athletics Championships, and he became only the second Brazilian in history to be the world champion in outdoor athletics. The first was the pole vaulter Fabiana Murer eleven years earlier in  Daegu, South Korea. Dos Santos was 0.13s from beating Benjamin's Americas record and 0.36s from beating Warholm's world record. At the Diamond Race final in Zürich in September, he became the Diamond League champion in his specialist event.

Achievements

Personal bests

400 m hurdles: 46.29 –  Eugene, OR, 19 July 2022, South American record
400 m: 44.54 –  Walnut, CA, 16 April 2022
4x400 m relay: 3:04.13 –  Lima, 26 May 2019

International competitions

Circuit wins and titles
 Diamond League champion 400 m hurdles:  2022
 400 metres hurdles wins, other events specified in parenthesis
 2021 (2): Stockholm Bauhaus-Galan, Brussels Memorial Van Damme
 2022 (7): Doha Diamond League, Eugene Prefontaine Classic (WL), Oslo Bislett Games, Stockholm (WL MR), Chorzów Kamila Skolimowska Memorial (MR), Brussels, Zürich Weltklasse

Record progression in the 400m hurdles
2017 – 53.82 (17 years old)
2018 – 49.78
2019 – 48.28
2020 – no competitions held
2021 – 46.72
2022 – 46.29

References

External links

 

2000 births
Living people
Brazilian male hurdlers
Sportspeople from São Paulo (state)
Athletes (track and field) at the 2019 Pan American Games
Pan American Games gold medalists for Brazil
Pan American Games medalists in athletics (track and field)
Pan American Games athletes for Brazil
South American Championships in Athletics winners
Pan American Games gold medalists in athletics (track and field)
Universiade gold medalists in athletics (track and field)
Universiade gold medalists for Brazil
Medalists at the 2019 Summer Universiade
World Youth Championships in Athletics winners
Medalists at the 2019 Pan American Games
Olympic bronze medalists for Brazil
Olympic bronze medalists in athletics (track and field)
Athletes (track and field) at the 2020 Summer Olympics
Medalists at the 2020 Summer Olympics
Olympic athletes of Brazil
People from São Joaquim da Barra